Agents of S.H.I.E.L.D. is an American television series created for ABC by Joss Whedon, Jed Whedon, and Maurissa Tancharoen, based on the Marvel Comics organization S.H.I.E.L.D. It is set in the Marvel Cinematic Universe (MCU) and acknowledges the continuity of the franchise's films and other television series. The series was produced by ABC Studios, Marvel Television, and Mutant Enemy Productions, and sees Clark Gregg reprise his role as Phil Coulson from the film series.

Series overview

Episodes

Season 1 (2013–14)

Season 2 (2014–15)

Season 3 (2015–16)

Season 4 (2016–17)

Season 5 (2017–18)

Season 6 (2019)

Season 7 (2020)

References

General references

External links

 
Lists of American action television series episodes
Lists of American drama television series episodes
Lists of American science fiction television series episodes
Marvel Cinematic Universe episode lists